Carlos Luis "Cálix" Castro is a former Costa Rican footballer and manager.

He played for Costa Rica in a friendly against Panama on 23 June 1993. He later represented Costa Rica at the 1993 CONCACAF Gold Cup.

In 2002, he was appointed manager of A.D. Belén.

References

External links
 

Living people
Costa Rican footballers
Costa Rica international footballers
Association football midfielders
Year of birth missing (living people)
1993 CONCACAF Gold Cup players
A.D. Carmelita footballers
C.S. Herediano footballers
Costa Rican football managers